Donald John Smith (10 April 1926 – 22 August 2014) was a senior Anglican priest. He was Archdeacon of Suffolk from 1975 to 1984; and Archdeacon of Sudbury from 1984 to 1991.

Smith was educated at the University of Wales and Clifton Theological College He was ordained in 1954 and served curacies in Edgware and Ipswich. He was Vicar of St Mary, Hornsey Rise from 1958 to 1962; Rector  of Whitton from 1962 to 1975; and Rector   of Redgrave cum Botesdale with The Rickinghalls from 1975 to 1979.

Smith retired to Stretton-on-Fosse, before moving to Shipston-on-Stour. He died on August 22, 2014, at the age of 88. His funeral was held on September 5 at Whitton Church, where he had previously served as rector.

References

1926 births
2014 deaths
Alumni of the University of Wales
Archdeacons of Sudbury
Businesspeople from Ipswich